J Records was an American record label owned and operated by Bertelsmann Music Group until it was transferred to Sony Music Entertainment when they acquired all of BMG’s record labels in late 2008. It was distributed through the RCA Music Group. The label was founded in 2000 by Clive Davis and was dissolved into RCA Records in 2011.

Company history
J Records was founded in 2000 by industry veteran Clive Davis with $150 million in financing from BMG, after his ousting from Arista Records the same year, and initially operated as an independently managed company distributed through BMG. Olivia was the first artist to sign to J Records but was later dropped due to poor album sales. In 2001, the label found success with its multi-platinum record inaugural release, Songs in A Minor, the debut album of Alicia Keys, which sold over 12 million copies worldwide. The same year, Lyric signed to the label and became the first female group act under J Records. By late 2001, J Records attained another success with the platinum-selling debut album by O-Town. Later, established artists like D'Angelo, Luther Vandross, Jamie Foxx, and Monica would join the J roster, the latter three going on to find multi-platinum success with the label.
 
In 2002, BMG bought a majority stake in the label.  The same year, J Records began functioning under the RCA Music Group, where Davis had been appointed president and CEO, and signed American Idol winners Fantasia and Ruben Studdard. In August 2005, J Records' operations were merged with Arista Records, although both labels continued to release their own product.

In mid-2011, RCA Music Group underwent a restructuring which shuttered J along with sister labels Jive and Arista on October 7, 2011. RCA Records and began releasing all RCA Music Group releases under RCA Records.

Artist roster 

At time of disbanding

Alicia Keys
BC Jean
CJ Hilton
C-Ride
Fantasia
Jamie Foxx
Jazmine Sullivan
Krista Hidalgo
Leona Lewis
Mario
Marsha Ambrosius
Mike Posner
Monica 
Next
One Chance
O-Town 
Pitbull
Rod Stewart
Say Anything
SOiL
Grantland Steele
Kermit Furiouz
Kirby Twinz
Former
Maroon 5 (was signed to Octone Records by way of a joint deal with J Records)
Liza Minnelli
Busta Rhymes
Lil Josh & Ernest
Pearl Jam
Gavin DeGraw
Jimmy Cozier
Splender
Annie Lennox (US)
Erick Sermon

References

External links
 J Records website
 J Records on Altsounds.com
 Interview with J Records A&R Peter Edge

American record labels
Record labels established in 2000
Record labels disestablished in 2011
RCA Records Music Group
Sony Music
Rock record labels
Pop record labels